Zhang Huamei (born 1961) is the first private business owner of the People's Republic of China. She became the country's first officially licensed self-employed private entrepreneur following China's reform and opening up in 1979.

References 

Chinese businesspeople
Living people
1961 births